Rory Scot Albanese (born May 29, 1977) is an American comedian, comedy writer and television producer. He was a showrunner, executive producer and writer for The Daily Show with Jon Stewart, which he joined in 1999 and was with until October 2013. He was an executive producer and showrunner of The Nightly Show with Larry Wilmore.

Early life and education 
Albanese was born and raised in Rockville Centre, New York, to a Jewish-Italian family. He earned a Bachelor of Arts degree in communications from Boston University in 1999.

Career

Stand-up comedy
In the summer of 2006, he joined Lewis Black's Red, White, and Screwed tour, performing with Black all over the country. Albanese has performed with former Daily Show correspondents John Oliver and Wyatt Cenac. He headlines his own shows at clubs and colleges throughout the country.
In 2019, he became the executive producer of the ABC talk show Strahan, Sara & Keke.

Other work
He is the voice of "The American" on the podcast The Bugle.

TV and film work

Albanese's first half-hour comedy special premiered on April 2, 2010, on Comedy Central.

Personal life 
In 2010, Albanese was arrested for assault after punching a 9/11 truther who was heckling him outside a book signing.

In late 2020, Albanese began dating comedian Sarah Silverman after spending time remotely playing video games together during the COVID-19 pandemic.

References

External links
 
 
 

American comedy writers
American television writers
American male television writers
American people of Italian-Jewish descent
Emmy Award winners
1977 births
Living people
Boston University College of Communication alumni
Jewish American male comedians
Jewish American comedy writers
21st-century American comedians
21st-century American screenwriters
21st-century American male writers
21st-century American Jews